A Girl of the Limberlost is a 1924 American silent film, produced by Gene Stratton-Porter and directed by James Leo Meehan. It stars Gloria Grey, Emily Fitzroy, and Arthur Currier, and was released on April 28, 1924. The first adaptation of Stratton-Porter's famous novel, this silent film is considered lost.

Plot
The movie is set in Indiana, around the Limberlost swamp. It is the story of a young girl, Elnora Comstock, who is emotionally abused by her mother, who blames her for the death of her father. Elnora has a love of nature and sells her moth collection to pay for her education. As she begins her education, Elnora finds that she is exceptionally gifted in her classes, particularly in mathematics. Soon, she meets Phillip Ammon with whom she falls in love with. Phillip, who is engaged to Edith Carr, finds himself conflicted between the two. This results in Edith, who is angered by his interest in Elnora, jilting him.

However, Edith later attempts to rekindle the affection between the pair causing Elnora to leave in order to allow Phillip decide who he wishes to be with. Elnora's mother, Kate Comstock, eventually learns of the faithlessness of her husband and tries to make up to her daughter for her neglect and harshness. Philip then becomes sick and Elnora, who had been away, returns to take care of him. Deciding that he is truly in love with Elnora, Phillip asks her to marry him.

Cast

Gloria Grey as Elnora Comstock
Emily Fitzroy as Kate Comstock
Arthur Currier as Robert Comstock
Raymond Mckee as Phillip Ammon
Gertrude Olmsted as Edith Cart
Cullen Landis as Hart Henderson
Alfred Allen as Wesley Sinton
Virginia Boardman as Margaret Sinton
Myrtle Vane as Elvira Carney
Buck Black/Newton Hall as Billy
Lisamae Grey as the Bird-Woman

Production and distribution
The 1924 film was produced by Gene Stratton-Porter Productions, a film company the author herself founded to translate her many novels into movies. Porter was the primary writer of the story and scenarios and the film was directed by her son in law, James Leo Meehan. The silent movie was 6 reels long, approximating to around an hour in length. The aspect ratio was 1.33:1. A Girl of the Limberlost was distributed by the Film Booking Office of America (FBO) and received much praise from the public.

Reception
Following its release on April 28, 1924 this film received high praise from critics. Indeed, reviewers praised the acting in the film, one reviewer for Moving Picture World writing that Emily Fitzroy's portrayal of the somber, brooding women dominates the first half of the picture, partly through the dramatic force of the story and largely through her own expertness." Another reviewer for Exhibitors Herald mimics this opinion, also commenting on the "fine work" Gloria Grey performs throughout the movie.

The film was largely successful, noted as one of the surprise pictures of the year. In Everett, Washington, A Girl of the Limberlost made more money than some of the best pictures of the year and it played for 3 weeks in Los Angeles. The New York Daily News wrote, "If you've read the book, go see the picture,-if you haven't read it, go see it anyway."

References

External links
Girl of the Limberlost on IMDB

Films set in Indiana
Silent American drama films
Lost American films
Films directed by James Leo Meehan
Films based on works by Gene Stratton-Porter
Films based on American novels
American black-and-white films
1924 drama films
1920s English-language films
1924 lost films
Lost drama films
1920s American films